The 2007 Central American Junior and Youth Championships in Athletics were held at the Estadio Nacional Flor Blanca "Magico Gonzalez" in San Salvador, El Salvador, between May 25–27, 2007. Organized by the Central American Isthmus Athletic Confederation (CADICA), it was the 20th edition of the Junior (U-20) and the 15th edition of the Youth (U-18) competition. A total of 76 events were contested, 42 by boys and 34 by girls.

Medal summary
Complete results can be found on the CADICA webpage.

Junior

Boys (U-20)

Girls (U-20)

Youth

Boys (U-18)

Girls (U-18)

Medal table (unofficial)

Team trophies
The placing table for team trophy awarded to the 1st place overall team (boys and girls categories) was published.

Overall

Participation
A total number of 320 athletes were reported to participate in the event.  Belize did not send athletes.

 (80)
 (67)

 Panamá

References

 
Central American Junior
Central American Junior
International athletics competitions hosted by El Salvador
Athl
2007 in youth sport